Zoica is a genus of wolf spiders in the family Lycosidae, containing twelve species.

Species
 Zoica bambusicola Lehtinen & Hippa, 1979 — Thailand
 Zoica bolubolu Lehtinen & Hippa, 1979 — New Guinea
 Zoica carolinensis Framenau, Berry & Beatty, 2009 — Caroline Islands
 Zoica falcata Lehtinen & Hippa, 1979 — Borneo, New Guinea
 Zoica harduarae (Biswas & Roy, 2008) — India
 Zoica minuta (McKay, 1979) — Western Australia
 Zoica oculata Buchar, 1997 — Bhutan
 Zoica pacifica Framenau, Berry & Beatty, 2009 — Marshall Islands
 Zoica parvula (Thorell, 1895) — Sri Lanka, Myanmar, Thailand, Malaysia
 Zoica puellula (Simon, 1898) — India, Sri Lanka
 Zoica unciformis Li, Wang & Zhang, 2013 — China
 Zoica wauensis Lehtinen & Hippa, 1979 — New Guinea

References

Lycosidae
Spiders of Asia
Spiders of Oceania
Araneomorphae genera